Merritt Clarke Ring (October 30, 1850 – July 21, 1915) was an American lawyer and politician from Wisconsin.

Born in Milton, Wisconsin, he moved with his family to Madison and then Sparta, Wisconsin where he went to school. He taught school and then went to the University of Wisconsin Law School graduating in 1873. He then practiced law with Clarion A. Youmans in Neillsville, Wisconsin. He also owned a livestock farm. Ring served in the Wisconsin State Senate in 1885 and then in the Wisconsin State Assembly in 1889 as a Republican. In 1892, Ring was appointed special statistic agent for the United States Department of Agriculture for Europe with offices in London, England. He also served as United States deputy consul general in London. In 1895, he was appointed attorney for the Chicago and Northwestern Railroad. He died in Neillsville, Wisconsin.

Notes

1850 births
1915 deaths
People from Milton, Wisconsin
People from Sparta, Wisconsin
People from Neillsville, Wisconsin
University of Wisconsin–Madison alumni
University of Wisconsin Law School alumni
19th-century American diplomats
United States Department of Agriculture officials
Wisconsin lawyers
Republican Party members of the Wisconsin State Assembly
Republican Party Wisconsin state senators
19th-century American politicians
19th-century American lawyers